Abhishek Sharma is an Indian film director and writer known for his works in Hindi films. He has directed comedy films like Tere Bin Laden (2010), its sequel Tere Bin Laden: Dead or Alive (2016) and The Shaukeens (2014). His film Parmanu: The Story of Pokhran (2018) is based on the nuclear tests named Pokhran-II.

Filmography

References

External links
 

21st-century Indian film directors
Living people
Hindi-language film directors
Year of birth missing (living people)